Elections were held in the Bicol Region for seats in the House of Representatives of the Philippines on May 10, 2010.

The candidate with the most votes won that district's seat for the 15th Congress of the Philippines.

Summary
*Totals for invalid votes and turnout are unavailable in Camarines Norte's districts.

Albay

All incumbent congressmen in Albay are eligible for reelection.

1st District
Edcel Lagman is the incumbent.

2nd District
Al Francis Bichara is the incumbent.

3rd District
Reno Lim is the incumbent. Lim faced former Albay governor Fernando Gonzalez

The result of the election is under protest in the House of Representatives Electoral Tribunal.

Camarines Norte

Camarines Norte will have two representatives starting in the 15th Congress; the lone district was split into two.

Liwayway Vinzons-Chato will be the last representative of Camarines Norte's lone district; she will run for representative in the new second district.

1st District
The result of the election is under protest in the House of Representatives Electoral Tribunal.

2nd District
Liwayway Vinzons-Chato is the incumbent.

The result of the election is under protest in the House of Representatives Electoral Tribunal.

Camarines Sur

A new fifth district was carved out of the old first and second districts of Camarines Sur by virtue of Republic Act 9716, becoming the second district. The redistricting was seen to prevent President Gloria Macapagal Arroyo's son and incumbent 1st district representative Diosdado Ignacio Arroyo from being in the same district as Secretary of Budget and Management Rolando Andaya. It was also alleged that the new district fell short of the required minimum of 250,000 inhabitants in order to be a separate district. The old third and fourth districts become the new fourth and fifth districts. Andaya's wife eventually run in his place but eventually withdrew for her husband on December 15, 2009, after filing for substitution. On February 25, 2010, Andaya effectively resigned as Budget Secretary following a Supreme Court decision saying that all appointive officials running for office are deemed resigned.

1st District
Incumbent Diosdado Macapagal Arroyo's (Lakas-Kampi-CMD), son of President Gloria Macapagal Arroyo, place of residence was moved from the first to the second district.

2nd District
For the 15th Congress, the 2nd district will comprise some of the municipalities of the old first and second districts, and Naga. The old second district, which didn't include any of the local government units of the new first and second districts, became the new third district.

3rd District
The old second district is now the third district. The old second district incumbent is Luis Villafuerte Sr. is running.

4th District
The old third is now the fourth district. The old third district's incumbent is Arnulfo Fuentebella is running.

5th District
The old fourth district becomes the new fifth district. Old fourth district incumbent Felix Alfelor Jr. (Lakas-Kampi-CMD) is in his third consecutive term and is ineligible for reelection. His son, Emmanuel, is his party's nominee for the new fifth district.

Mariano Trinidad is also entered into an alliance with the Pwersa ng Masang Pilipino.

The result of the election is under protest in the House of Representatives Electoral Tribunal.

Catanduanes

Incumbent Joseph Santiago (Nationalist People's Coalition) is in his third consecutive term already and is ineligible for reelection. NPC didn't name a nominee for the district's seat.

The result of the election is under protest in the House of Representatives Electoral Tribunal.

Masbate

1st District
Narciso Bravo Jr. is the incumbent.

2nd District
Antonio Kho is the incumbent.

3rd District
Incumbent Rizalina Seachon-Lanete is running for the provincial governorship; Scott Davies Lanete will run as her party's nominee for the district's seat..

Sorsogon

1st District

Salvador Escudero is the incumbent.

2nd District

Incumbent Jose Solis (Lakas-Kampi-CMD) is in his third consecutive term and is thus ineligible for reelection.

References

External links
Official website of the Commission on Elections

2010 Philippine general election
2010